The Pocket Testament League is a Christian nonprofit organization which distributes printed copies of the Gospels from the New Testament.

History 
The Pocket Testament League was founded in 1893 by a teenage girl named Helen Cadbury, as a means of converting her classmates. In 1904, Helen married American evangelist Charles McCallon Alexander, who officially organized the league with Dr. J. Wilbur Chapman at Philadelphia in March of 1908. Alexander had been associated with the prominent evangelist Dwight L. Moody, and his experience in worldwide evangelism gave huge impetus to the League. In 1914, The Pocket Testament League opened an office in London and began sharing gospels as part of its First World War outreach. In October, one of their campaigns gave out 400,000 New Testaments to soldiers on Salisbury Plain.

During the Great Depression, members of the League shared Gospels through the Civilian Conservation Corps in the South and throughout New England. Billy Graham encouraged the League, commenting that "I am completely sold on the work of The Pocket Testament League, and continue to pray for those associated with it."

After the Second World War, the league started its missionary work in foreign countries. With the support of Generals George Marshall and Chiang Kai-shek, Bibles were distributed among Chinese soldiers fighting in the Chinese Civil War.

Present
The League has over 450,000 members, and a staff of 5 full-time people that work from virtual offices. The League has members from all 50 U.S. states and from 140 countries.

Today, the league still prints small, pocket-sized Gospels of John in languages such as English, Simplified Chinese, Traditional Chinese, Italian, Japanese, Russian, German, Spanish and Portuguese, with wide range of cover designs. It partners with local Bible Societies for accurate Bible translations and ships from several locations around the world.

A small team runs the ministry and it is managed by a 15-person board of trustees.

See also 

 Gideons International

References

External links 

The Pocket Testament league around the world  by George T.B. Davis
The Remarkable Story of Helen Cadbury at Therebelution.com

Further reading 
Helen Cadbury And Charles M. Alexander Copyright 1989 Simon Fox A Love That Embraced the World by Simon Fox

American evangelists
Christian missions
Religious organizations established in 1893